The 91st Infantry Division was a division of the Philippine Army under the United States Army Forces in the Far East (USAFFE).

Organization

History
It was active from 1941 to April 9, 1942, whereupon it surrendered when Bataan fell.  Col. (later BGen.) Luther R. Stevens (PA) was the division's commander, and Col. Edgar H. Keltner, Inf., was Chief of Staff.

Combat Narrative
At the outset of hostilities, 8 December 1941, the 91st Division (PA) was part of the USAFFE Reserve Force, alongside the U.S. Army's Philippine Division, the 1st Tank Group (Provisional), and three smaller Philippine Scouts units (43rd Infantry (PS), 86th FA Bn. (PS), & 88th FA Regt. (PS).)

Order of battle
 91st Infantry Regiment (PA)
 92nd Infantry Regiment (PA) (Col. John H. Rodman, Inf.; XO: Col. James D Carter, Inf.)
 93rd Infantry Regiment (PA) (Maj. John C. Goldtrap) (left behind on Samar & Leyte, 9 Dec 41; transf. to Cagayan Sector, Mindanao Force)
 91st Field Artillery Regiment
 91st FA Regt HQ Company 
 1st Bn/91st FA Regt (PA) (75mm guns, 8x))
 2nd Bn/91st FA Regt (PA) (2.95-inch pack howitzers, 8x) 
 3rd Bn/91st FA Regt (PA) 
 91st Engineer Battalion (PA) 
 91st Division Units 
 91st Division Headquarters & HQ Company
 91st Medical Battalion
 91st Signal Company 
 91st Quartermaster Company (Motorized) 
 91st QM Transport Company (Truck)

Sources

Bibliography
Morton, Louis. The Fall of the Philippines (Publication 5-2) . Retrieved on 14 Feb 2017.

References

Infantry divisions of the Philippines
Military units and formations of the Philippine Army in World War II
Military units and formations established in 1941
Military units and formations disestablished in 1942